John Peet may refer to:
John Peet (surgeon) (1818–1874), British surgeon
John Peet (1915–1988), British journalist
John Peet (born 1954), British journalist
J. H. John Peet, travelling secretary of the Biblical Creation Society